Palatinate-Birkenfeld-Bischweiler was a state of the Holy Roman Empire based around Bischwiller. It was formed in 1600, after the separation from Palatinate-Zweibrücken-Birkenfeld and was incorporated into Palatine Zweibrücken in 1731.

History 
Palatinate-Birkenfeld-Bischweiler was partitioned from Palatinate-Zweibrücken-Birkenfeld in 1600 for Christian I, the youngest son of Count Palatine Charles I. The state was partitioned into itself and Palatinate-Birkenfeld-Gelnhausen in 1654. In 1671 Count Palatine Christian II inherited Palatinate-Zweibrücken-Birkenfeld and this state ceased to exist.

List of rulers

Notes 

House of Wittelsbach
Counties of the Holy Roman Empire
States and territories established in 1600
States and territories disestablished in 1731